This is a list of defunct airlines of Turkey.

See also
 List of airlines of Turkey
 List of airports in Turkey

References

Turkey
Airlines
Airlines, defunct